Pala Airport  is a public use airport located near Pala, Mayo-Kebbi Ouest, Chad.

See also
List of airports in Chad

References

External links 
 Airport record for Pala Airport at Landings.com

Airports in Chad
Mayo-Kebbi Ouest Region